FK Mladost Krivogaštani is a football club based in the village of Krivogaštani near Prilep, North Macedonia. They are currently competing in the Macedonian Third League (South Division).

History
The club was founded in 1930.

References

External links
Club info at MacedonianFootball 
Football Federation of Macedonia 

Mladost Krivogastani
Association football clubs established in 1930
1930 establishments in Yugoslavia
FK